Sama is part of the town of Harstad within Harstad Municipality in Troms county, Norway.  It is located just northwest of the city center.  To the north is the Samaåsen hill, to the south is the Harstadåsen hill, to the southwest is the Blåbærhaugen hill, and to the west is Bergseng. The street Samagata goes through the area.

Situated in Sama are shops, a gas station and different services, along with many people living in the area.

References

Harstad